Roman Lysko (14 August 1914 – 14 October 1949) was a Ukrainian Greek Catholic priest and martyr.

Lysko was born on 14 August 1914 in Horodok, Lviv Oblast. He studied theology and graduated from the Lviv Theological Academy. On 28 August 1941 he was ordained a priest by Metropolitan Andrey Sheptytsky.  He was pastor of the Archeparchy of Lviv for Ukrainians.

He was assigned administrator for the parish in the village of Kotliw, Oliyiv county. In 1944 Lysko was assigned to a parish in the village of Belzets, Zolochiv county. He was also a member of the underground Ukrainian youth organization Plast in his 30s and leader of the Plast group "Fox" (Lys).

Lysko was also active in working with youth, together with his wife (ordaining married priests is a common practice in the Eastern Churches, since the beginning of Christianity).

He refused to sign statement of conversion to Orthodoxy. 

On 9 September 1949, he was arrested by the NKVD. He was put into prison in Lviv.  The people of the city reported hearing him loudly sing Psalms after he was tortured.  His torturers reportedly thought he had gone insane.  He died from starvation after being immured in the prison walls.  The official date of his death was 14 October 1949. For years his family attempted to find out his fate until they were told in 1956 that he died of heart paralysis, but some witnesses reported seeing him in prison after this date, with accounts that they had heard him singing the psalms. It was even reported that he was sealed up in a wall, still alive, where he gave his life as martyr.  

A plaque on that building on Lonsky Avenue reads that "here, within the walls of this building, entombed alive, lies Father Roman Lysko, who gave up his life for his faith."

He was beatified by Pope John Paul II on 27 June 2001.

Niece's testimony 
"He was imprisoned on Lontskyi Street. His mother brought him some packages. Sometimes his grandmother came from Zhulychi to visit him. At first the packages were accepted. The prisoner always had the right to thank the giver with the same card with which the package was sent. These cards were always sent back; even the bags in which they usually put the packages were sent back. And there were always those cards, on which he wrote, ""Thank you. Many kisses', and signed it. After the murder of Halan [a communist agitator], they refused to accept packages. But after 6 months, when they started to accept packages again, then the relatives found a card with 'thanks' and a signature written, but in a stranger's hand. It was a completely different handwriting." – From an interview with his niece, Lidia Kupchyk.

Notes

References 	
Biographies of twenty five Greek-Catholic Servants of God at the website of the Vatican	
Beatification of the Servants of God on June 27, 2001 at the website of the Ukrainian Greek Catholic Church
Francisco Radecki. Tumultuous Times: The Twenty General Councils of the Catholic Church and Vatican II and Its Aftermath. St. Joseph's Media, 2004. 
Blessed Roman Lysko Patron Saints Index.
Rev. Roman Maria Lysko

1914 births
1949 deaths
Members of the Ukrainian Greek Catholic Church
Eastern Catholic beatified people
Ukrainian beatified people
Ukrainian people executed by the Soviet Union
20th-century Eastern Catholic martyrs
People executed by starvation
People from Horodok, Lviv Oblast
People from the Kingdom of Galicia and Lodomeria
Beatifications by Pope John Paul II